The Piacenza–Cremona railway is a railway line in Italy.

On 12 December 2013 passenger service on the line was terminated, and was substituted by 2 buses for the connection between Piacenza and Cremona. Since then, the line is only used by freight trains.

See also 
 List of railway lines in Italy

References

Footnotes

Sources
 
 

Railway lines in Emilia-Romagna
Railway lines in Lombardy
Railway lines opened in 1933
Cremona
Piacenza